The 1997–98 NCAA football bowl games concluded the 1997 NCAA Division I-A football season. In the third and final year of the Bowl Alliance era, Nebraska defeated Tennessee in the 1998 Orange Bowl, designated as the Bowl Alliance national championship for the 1997 season. AP-No. 1 ranked Michigan defeated Washington State in the 1998 Rose Bowl, which was not a part of the Bowl Alliance. Michigan was awarded the national championship by the AP Poll and Nebraska by the Coaches Poll.

A total of 20 bowl games were played between December 20, 1997 and January 2, 1998 by 40 bowl-eligible teams. Two new bowl games were added this year: the Motor City Bowl (now known as the Little Caesars Pizza Bowl), and the Humanitarian Bowl (now known as the Famous Idaho Potato Bowl).

Non-Bowl Alliance bowls

Bowl Alliance bowls

References